Adoni railway station (station code:AD) is located in Kurnool district in the Indian state of  Andhra Pradesh and serves the city of Adoni. It is one of the major railway station of the South Coast railway.

Classification 

Adoni is classified as a 'NSG4–category'' station in the Guntakal railway division.

Electrification 
Electrification work in the  Pune–Wadi–Guntakal sector was initiated in 2013.

References

External links 

Railway stations in Kurnool district
Guntakal railway division